Zürich Rehalp railway station is a railway station and tram stop in the Swiss canton of Zürich, on the boundary between the city of Zürich and the municipality of Zollikon. The  station is located on the line of the Forchbahn (FB), which is operated as Zürich S-Bahn service S18. The station is operated by Verkehrsbetriebe Zürich and Forchbahn AG and is the first true railway station on the S18 outbound from its city terminus at Zürich Stadelhofen FB. Between Stadelhofen and a point immediately to the city side of Rehalp station, the S18 operates over the tracks of the Zürich tram network, stopping at selected tram stops. Beyond Rehalp, the service operates on its own dedicated right of way.

On the opposite side of the Forchstrasse main road lies the turnaround loop and platforms for route 11 of the Zürich tram system, which operates over the same tracks as the S18 between Stadelhofen and Rehalp, but serving all intermediate tram stops.

Services 
 the following rail services stop at Zürich Rehalp:

Gallery

References

External links 
 
 Haltestelleninfos – Forchbahn 

Rehalp
Tram stops in Zürich